Lady Gwendolen Georgiana Gascoyne-Cecil (28 July 1860 – 28 September 1945) was a British author who wrote a four-volume biography of her father, Robert Gascoyne-Cecil, entitled Life of Robert, Marquis of Salisbury. She also wrote a short story called The Little Ray for the August 1894 edition of Pall Mall Magazine.

Lady Gwendolen was born in 1860, the daughter of Robert Gascoyne-Cecil, 3rd Marquess of Salisbury, and his wife, the former Georgina Alderson.

In 1878 British Prime Minister Benjamin Disraeli stayed at her family home and he wrote to Queen Victoria that he had rarely met (referring to Gwendolen and her sister) "more intelligent and agreeable women."

In October 2017, author Johnny Mains revealed Lady Gwendolen as the author of the story The Closed Cabinet - a work once considered anonymous.

References

18th-century British women writers
19th-century British women writers
Women biographers
1860 births
1945 deaths
Daughters of British marquesses
Children of prime ministers of the United Kingdom
18th-century British writers
19th-century British writers